Francisco Seixas da Costa, GCC, CMG, (Vila Real, 1948) is a retired Portuguese diplomat. He was also member of Portuguese governments. He is now consultant in the private sector and media commentator on international affairs.

Main official functions

1975-2013 - Career diplomat, Portuguese Ministry of Foreign Affairs;
1979-1982 - Embassy of Portugal in Oslo, Norway;
1982-1986 - Embassy of Portugal in Luanda, Angola;
1986-1987 - Head of Division, European Affairs Department, Ministry of Foreign Affairs, Lisbon;
1987-1990 - Adviser to the Secretary of State for Development Co-operation, Lisbon;
1990-1994 - Minister Counsellor, Embassy of Portugal in London, UK;
1994-1995 - Deputy Director-General for European Affairs, Ministry of Foreign Affairs, Lisbon;
1995-2001 - Secretary of State (Deputy Foreign Minister) for European Affairs, Lisbon;
2001-2002 - Permanent Representative to the United Nations, New York;
2002-2004 - Permanent Representative to the Organisation for Security and Co-operation in Europe, Vienna;
2004-2008 - Ambassador to Brazil.
2009-2013 - Ambassador to France.
2010-2013 - Also ambassador to Monaco.
2012-2013 - Also Permanent Representative to UNESCO (United Nations Organisation for Education, Science and Culture)

Other official functions
 1987-1989 - Portuguese chief negotiator of Lomé IV convention
     1990-1993 - Deputy permanent representative to the Western European Union (WEU)
     1995-2001 - Head of the Portuguese delegations to the Council of Europe (CoE), the Organisation for Economic and Development Co-Operation (OECD) and World Trade Organisation (WTO) ministerial meetings
     1995/97 - Portuguese chief negotiator of the EU Amsterdam treaty
     1997 - President of the Committee of ministers of the Schengen Agreement
     2000 - President of the Council of ministers of the EU Internal Market
     2000 - Portuguese chief negotiator of the EU Nice treaty
     2001 - Vice-president of the UN Economic and Social Council (ECOSOC)
     2001/02 - Chairman of the Second Committee (Economic and Financial affairs) of the 56th UN General Assembly
     2002- Vice-president of the 57th UN General Assembly
     2002 - President of the Permanent Council of the Organization for Security and Co-operation in Europa (OSCE)
     2001/02 - Member of the Board of the United Nations Fund for Internationals Partnerships
     2013/2014 - Executive Director of the North-South Centre of the Council of Europe

Other functions

     2009/13 - President of the General Council of Trás-os-Montes e Alto Douro University (UTAD)
     2010/18 - Member of the Consultative Council of the School of Economics, University of Coimbra
     2011/13 - Member of the General Council of Guimarães - European Capital of Culture 2012
     2013/18 - Member of the Consultative Council, Universidade Nova de Lisboa
     2013/18 - Member of the Consultative Council, Calouste Gulbenkian Foundation
     2014/18 - Invited professor, Universidade Autónoma de Lisboa
     2015/18 - Invited professor, Universidade Europeia, Lisbon
     2018/21 - Member of the Independent General Council, Radio e Televisão de Portugal S. A., Lisbon

Current functions

     Since 2013 - Member of the Board of Directors, Jerónimo Martins.
     Since 2018 - Member of the Board of Directors, Mota-Engil.
     Since 2018 - Chairman of the Advisory Council, Kearney Portugal
     Since 2020 - Chairman of the Supervisory Board, Philipp Morris Portugal
     Since 2021 - CNN Portugal commentator in international affairs
     Since 2016 - Member of the Advisory Council, Chancery for Civil Merit Orders, Presidency of Republic, Lisbon
     Since 2019 - Chairman of the think tank "Club of Lisbon - Global Challenges"

Bibliography

"Diplomacia Europeia - Instituições, Alargamento e o Futuro da União" ("European Diplomacy - the institutions, the enlargement and the future of the Union"), Lisbon, 2002;
"Uma Segunda Opinião - Notas de Política Externa e Diplomacia" ("A Second Opinion - Notes on External Policy and Diplomacy"), Lisbon, 2006;
"As Vésperas e a Alvorada de Abril" ("The vespers and the April dawn"), Brasília, 2007;
"Tanto Mar? - Portugal, o Brasil e a Europa" ("So much sea? - Portugal, Brazil and Europe"), Brasília, 2008.
"Apontamentos" ("Notes"), Lisbon, 2008.
 “A Cidade Imaginária” ("Imaginary City"), Vila Real, 2021.

References

1948 births
Living people
People from Vila Real, Portugal
Portuguese diplomats